Denis Petrovich Butsayev (Russian: Денис Петрович Буца́ев; born on 7 March 1977), is a Russian statesman, who served as the acting governor of Belgorod Oblast from 22 September 2020 to 18 November 2020.  He was also the First Deputy Governor of the Belgorod Region from 17 to 20 November 2020.

Biography

Denis Butsaev was born on 7 March 1977 in Moscow. He is the grandson of Vyacheslav Tsymbal, an honorary lawyer of Russia, and a member of the Moscow Legal Center Bar Association.

Butsayev began his work in 1998 as a lawyer in the regional division of IBM IBM Corporation for Europe, the Middle East and Africa.

In 1999, he graduated from Oleg Kutafin Moscow State Law University with a degree in Jurisprudence.

From 2004 to 2007, Butsayev headed the legal department of the CIS and Eastern Europe, at the same time was a member of the board of directors of Hewlett-Packard LLC (the Russian branch of the group).

From 10 July 2014 to 19 December 2018, Butsayev was Deputy Prime Minister of the Moscow Oblast Government, in parallel from 10 September 2015 to 20 September 2018, he headed the Regional Ministry of Investments and Innovations.

On 19 February 2019, Prime Minister Dmitry Medvedev appointed Butsayev as CEO of the Russian environmental operator, but on November 23, he left his post.

On 17 September 2020, the Governor of the Belgorod Oblast, Yevgeny Savchenko, appointed Butsayev as his first deputy  and immediately resigned after that.

Butsayev became the acting governor of Belgorod Oblast until 18 November 2020.

References

1977 births
Living people
Governors of Belgorod Oblast
Kutafin Moscow State Law University alumni